Suijiang County is a county in the northeast of Yunnan province, China, bordering Sichuan province across the Jinsha River to the north and west. It is under the administration of the prefecture-level city of Zhaotong.

Administrative divisions
Suijiang County has 5 towns. 
5 towns

Transport 
China National Highway 213

Farmer protest
At the end of March 2011, media reports and eyewitnesses say about 400 paramilitary troops, tactical unit police and militia members and riot police have dispersed a large-scale, 5-day protest by thousands of farmers who were upset about being moved off their land for a dam without adequate compensation.

Climate

References

External links
Suijiang County Official Website

County-level divisions of Zhaotong